Imdad Ullah Bosal (born 14 June 1972) is a Pakistani civil servant who serves in BPS-22 grade as the Chief Secretary, Government of Khyber Pakhtunkhwa since February 2023. He belongs to the Pakistan Administrative Service.

Early life and education 
Imdad Ullah was born to Chaudhry Muhammad Iqbal Bosal. He hails from Tibba Chaudhry Manak Bosal, Mandi Bahauddin. He is brother of Chaudhry Nasir Iqbal Bosal who is currently Member National Assembly of Pakistan from Mandi Bahauddin. His maternal grandfather Chaudhry Jahan Khan Bosal was elected as Member of Punjab Legislative Assembly in 1946 elections from Gujrat. His paternal grandfather Chaudhry Manak Khan Bosal, in whose name Imdad's ancestral village has been named, remained a Member of Sixth Legislator of Provincial Assembly of West Pakistan (1956-1969).

He holds a master's degree in Political Economy of Development from School of Oriental and African Studies (SOAS), University of London. He also holds a master's degree in Public Policty from University of Oxford.

Career in civil service 
Imdad Ullah Bosal qualified Central Superior Services exam in 1994 and got allocation in District Management Group (now Pakistan Administrative Service). He joined Pakistan Administrative Service on November 19, 1995.

During his career in civil service, he has served as Federal Secretary of Industries and Production Division, Special Secretary and Additional Secretary in Finance Division, Additional Secretary in Economic Affairs Division, Principal Secretary to Chief Minister of Punjab, and Secretary (Implementation) to Chief Minister of Punjab.

He was posted as Chief Secretary, Government of Khyber Pakhtunkhwa on Feb 2, 2023.

His other career appointments include Commissioner Lahore, Commissioner Rawalpindi, District Coordination Officer Rawalpindi (Sep 2008 to Feb 2011), Deputy Secretary, Additional Secretary, and Special Secretary in Finance Department, Government of the Punjab, and Additional Secretary in Health Department, Government of the Punjab.

References

Pakistani civil servants
Pakistani government officials
Living people
1972 births